The FIL European Luge Championships 2010  took place 19 – 24 January 2010 in Sigulda, Latvia for the second time, hosting the event previously in 1996.

Festivities
The opening ceremonies took place on 22 January 2010 at 19:00 EET. Award ceremonies for all events were held at the end of each day of competition.

Men's singles
24 January 2010 at 09:40 EET (Run 1) and 11:30 EET. Demtschenko set the track record in the first run and had the fastest time in the second run to win his third straight medal. Germany's Johannes Ludwig had the fastest start times in both runs, but could only manage fifth. Kindl and Pfister earned their first individual medals while defending champion Armin Zöggeler of Italy did not participate in preparation for the 2010 Winter Olympics in Vancouver.

Women's singles
23 January 2010 at 09:30 EET (Run 1) and 11:15 EET (Run 2). The German women's team withdrew prior to the championships in an effort to focus on training for the 2010 Winter Olympics though they participated in the final luge World Cup event of the season at Cesana Pariol the following weekend. Ivanova becomes the first Russian to medal in this event at the championships, the first Soviet-Russian since Vera Zozula in 1976, and the first non-German to win since Italy's Gerda Weissensteiner in 1994.

Men's doubles
23 January 2010 at 12:30 EET (Run 1) and 13:45 EET (Run 2). The defending Olympic champions won gold to give them a complete set of medals after winning silver in 2008 and bronze in 2004. It was also Austria's first gold medal at the championships since 2002 and the first in this event at the championships since 1982.

Mixed team relay
24 January 2010 at 13:45 EET. Latvia repeated as champions. Only seven teams competed in the event though Slovakia was disqualified during the women's singles part of the run.

Medal table

Notes and references

FIL European Luge Championships
2010 in luge
Luge in Latvia
2010 in Latvian sport
International luge competitions hosted by Latvia
Sport in Sigulda
January 2010 sports events in Europe